Sides is a surname. Notable people with the surname include:

Doug Sides (born 1942), American jazz drummer
Francis Sides (1913–1943), Australian cricketer
Hampton Sides (born 1962), American historian, writer and journalist
John H. Sides (1904–1978), United States Navy admiral
Marilyn Sides, American writer
Shawn Sides, American voice actress